Bonetogastrura is a genus of springtails in the family Hypogastruridae. There are about seven described species in Bonetogastrura.

Species
These seven species belong to the genus Bonetogastrura:
 Bonetogastrura balazuci (Delamare Deboutteville, 1951) i c g
 Bonetogastrura delhezi (Stomp & Thibaud, 1974) i c g
 Bonetogastrura nivalis (Martynova, 1973) i c g
 Bonetogastrura soulensis Thibaud, 1975 i c g
 Bonetogastrura spelicola (Gisin, 1964) i c g
 Bonetogastrura subterranea (Carl, 1906) i c g
 Bonetogastrura variabilis (Christiansen, 1951) i c g
Data sources: i = ITIS, c = Catalogue of Life, g = GBIF, b = Bugguide.net

References

Further reading

 
 
 

Collembola
Springtail genera